Shahr-e Pir (also Romanized as Shahr-e Pīr and Shahr Pīr) is a city and capital of Izadkhvast District, in Zarrin Dasht County, Fars Province, Iran.  At the 2006 census, its population was 7,161, in 1,549 families.

References

Populated places in Zarrin Dasht County

Cities in Fars Province